Damir Matovinović (born April 6, 1940) is a Croatian retired football referee. He is mostly known for supervising one match (between Brazil and New Zealand) at the 1982 FIFA World Cup in Spain.

References
 Profile 
 
 Matovinović odlazi iz nogometa 

1940 births
Croatian football referees
FIFA World Cup referees
Living people
1982 FIFA World Cup referees
Sportspeople from Rijeka
Yugoslav football referees
Presidents of the Croatian Football Federation